Bernard Zuel is an Australian music journalist. Zuel wrote for Fairfax Media newspapers The Age and The Sydney Morning Herald since 1992. He became their senior music writer and reviewer. Zuel is a judge of the Australian Music Prize award. At the end of June 2017 he left Fairfax Media to become a freelance journalist and also taught music journalism.

Early life and education

Bernard Zuel was born in Rose-Hill, Mauritius. In the late 1960s, with his family, father Cyril,  mother Irlande and two younger siblings, he relocated to Australia and settled in Sydney.

In the podcast Penmanship (2016), Zuel told Andrew McMillen how he wrote his first review when he was 20-years-old on R.E.M.'s Fables of the Reconstruction (1985), which he submitted to street press. He was surprised to find it was published and worked for street press before he got a job as a general news reporter at The Penrith Press. He worked there for a few years before starting at The Sydney Morning Herald in 1992, where he became the senior music writer and reviewer.

Zuel regularly talks music on ABC local radio and appears on The Right Note. After 25 years at The Sydney Morning Herald, he left in June 2017 to become a freelance journalist at his website and to teach music journalism.

References

External links
 
 
 https://2ser.com/interview-bernard-zuel-looks-back-career-fairfax-media/
 https://www.smh.com.au/entertainment/music/kate-elvis-pj-and-me-25-years-and-more-of-a-love-affair-with-music-20170628-gwzz9m.html
 https://www.smh.com.au/by/bernard-zuel-hvevg

1965 births
Living people
Australian music journalists
Australian journalists
Australian people of Mauritian descent
The Sydney Morning Herald people